Yandex Metrica ( tr. Yandeks Metrika; stylised as Yandex.Metrica) is a free web analytics service offered by Yandex that tracks and reports website traffic. Yandex launched the service in 2008 and made it public in 2009.

As of 2019, Yandex.Metrica is the third most widely used web analytics service on the web.

Features
Yandex.Metrica uses a simple JavaScript tag that a webmaster implements on their website. The tag collects audience, traffic, and behaviour data for the website. Metrica can be also linked with Yandex.Direct online advertising platform to collect ads conversion rate.

See also
 Google Analytics

References

External links

Official Blog 

Web analytics
Web log analysis software
Yandex